Deusdedit (died between 1097 and 1100) was the cardinal-priest of San Pietro in Vincoli (Sanctus Petrus ad Vincula).

Born at Todi, he was a friend of Pope Gregory VII and defender of his reformation measures. Deusdedit joined the Benedictine Order and became a zealous promoter of ecclesiastical reforms in the latter half of the eleventh century.

References

11th-century Italian cardinals
Benedictine bishops
1090s deaths
Year of birth unknown
Canon law jurists
11th-century Italian jurists
People from the Province of Perugia